Edia minutissima is a moth in the family Crambidae. It was described by Smith in 1906. It is found in North America, where it has been recorded from Arizona and California.

The length of the forewings is 5–6 mm. Adults have been recorded on wing in February and from April to May.

References

Moths described in 1906
Odontiini